Saralanj or Saralandzh or Saralandj may refer to:
Saralanj, Aragatsotn, Armenia
Saralanj, Kotayk, Armenia
Saralanj, Lori, Armenia
Saralanj, Shirak, Armenia
Cilən, Azerbaijan